Warden Railway Bridge is a railway bridge carrying the Tyne Valley line between  and  across the River South Tyne near Warden, Northumberland.

History
The first bridge at Warden for the railway between Newcastle upon Tyne and Carlisle was designed by John Blackmore and originally built of timber; it burnt down in 1848 and cast-iron arches were placed on the original piers. A second bridge on a different alignment was completed in 1904 and remains in use as part of the Tyne Valley line.

References

Railway bridges in Northumberland
Crossings of the River Tyne